Stefano Fanelli (born 20 October 1969) is a retired Luxembourgian football striker. He became Luxembourg National Division top goalscorer in 1993–94.

References

1969 births
Living people
Luxembourgian footballers
F91 Dudelange players
Association football forwards
Luxembourg international footballers